Labastide-Murat, formerly Labastide-Fortunière (Lengadocian: La Bastida Fortunièra), is a former commune in the Lot department in south-western France. On 1 January 2016, it was merged into the new commune of Cœur de Causse. It was renamed after Napoleon Bonaparte's brother in law and famed Marshal of France Joachim Murat, who was born there in 1767.

See also
Communes of the Lot department

References

Labastidemurat
Joachim Murat